Montipora capitata, commonly known as rice coral or pore coral, is a stony coral in the family Acroporidae. It is a reef building species and is found in tropical parts of the Pacific Ocean.

Description
Montipora capitata is an encrusting, colonial coral which develops arborescent forms as it matures. The corallites are tiny and well separated by coenosteum. Their walls and the septa are indistinct. The skeleton is porous and there are small smooth surface projections known as verrucae which give the coral its common name of rice coral. These are irregularly spaced and may be fused near the tips of branches. The colour is normally pale brown with white verrucae.

Distribution
It is common in the waters around Hawaii especially where the sea is turbulent.

Ecology
The crown-of-thorns starfish (Acanthaster planci), seems to preferentially feed on corals of the genus Montipora. It is a voracious predator and can have devastating effects on slow growing corals.

Threats
Like other reef corals, Montipora capitata is threatened by habitat destruction. Rising sea temperatures can cause "bleaching" because the symbiotic zooxanthellae are expelled from the coral's tissues, leaving the coral colorless. The bleaching event results in very high coral mortality soon after. Stressed corals are more susceptible to disease. Other threats are posed by El Nino events, ocean acidification which tends to dissolve the coral skeleton, trawling and other fishing activities, pollution and sedimentation.

References

Acroporidae
Cnidarians of the Pacific Ocean
Marine fauna of Oceania
Corals described in 1846